Clamorosaurus is an extinct genus of temnospondyl amphibian. Fossils of Clamorosaurus have been found in the Inta Formation (Vorkuta series) in Russia. They are dated to about 272.5 million years ago, which was during the Ufimian interval of the Permian.
  
Clamorosaurus had a length of about 23 cm. (9 inches). The spaces in the interpterygoid bone of Clamorosaurus were rounded at the front. The external nares were large. Both of these characteristics are features of all members of Eryopidae.

References

Permian temnospondyls
Fossils of Russia
Eryopids
Prehistoric amphibian genera
Fossil taxa described in 1983